Combined Joint Task Force – Horn of Africa (CJTF-HOA) is a joint task force of United States Africa Command (AFRICOM). It originated under Operation Enduring Freedom – Horn of Africa (OEF-HOA) as part of the United States response to the September 11, 2001 attacks.

Overview

The mission of the CJTF-HOA is to conduct operations in the Combined Joint Operations Area to enhance partner nation capacity, promote regional security and stability, dissuade conflict, and protect U.S. and coalition interests.

CJTF-HOA consists of about 2,000 servicemen and women from the United States military and allied countries. Currently, the task force has an assigned area of interest that includes Sudan, Somalia, Djibouti, Ethiopia, Eritrea, Seychelles and Kenya. Outside this Combined Joint Operating Area, the CJTF-HOA has operations in Mauritius, Comoros, Liberia, Rwanda, Uganda and Tanzania.

CJTF-HOA operations are encompassed by what the U.S. military has termed the ‘indirect approach’ with a focus on military-to-military engagements, civil-military operations, key leader engagements, and providing enabling support to partner nations. They provide short-term assistance by drilling wells for clean water, building functional schools, improving roadways and improving medical facilities. Long-term goals include working with partner nations to improve national and regional stability and security. Regional stability is increased through capacity-building operations such as civil affairs and military-to-military training; engineering and humanitarian support; medical, dental, and veterinarian civic action programs (MEDCAP, DENTCAP, VETCAP); security training for border and coastal areas; and counter-IED (C-IED) integration training. About 1,800 personnel from each branch of the U.S. military, civilian employees, and representatives from coalition and partner nations make up CJTF-HOA.

Commanders

 November 2002 to August 2003 – United States Marine Corps Major General John F. Sattler (task force headquarters, initially aboard Mount Whitney, was composed of element of headquarters 2nd Marine Division and II MEF.)
May 2004 to May 2005 - United States Marine Corps Major General Samuel T. Helland
 May 17, 2005 to April 12, 2006 – United States Marine Corps Major General Timothy F. Ghormley
 April 12, 2006 to February 14, 2007 – United States Navy Rear Admiral Richard W. Hunt (at least some headquarters elements drawn from Commander, Carrier Strike Group 6)
 February 14, 2007 to February 3, 2008 – United States Navy Rear Admiral James M. Hart
 February 8, 2008 to February 5, 2009 – United States Navy Rear Admiral Philip H. Greene, Jr.
 February 5, 2009 to March 27, 2010 – United States Navy Rear Admiral Anthony Kurta
 March 27, 2010 to May 19, 2011 – United States Navy Rear Admiral Brian L. Losey
 May 11, 2011 to May 26, 2012 – United States Navy Rear Admiral Michael T. Franken
 May 26, 2012 to March 28, 2013 – United States Army Major General Ralph O. Baker
 March 2013 to January 2014 - United States Army Major General Terry Ferrell 
 January 2014 - April 2015 - United States Army Major General Wayne Grigsby, Junior
 April 2015 - April 2016 - United States Army Major General Mark R. Stammer 
 April 2016 - April 2017 - United States Army Major General Kurt L. Sonntag
 April 2017 - May 2018 - United States Marine Corps Brigadier General David J. Furness 
 May 2018 - June 2018 - United States Army Brigadier General William L. Zana 
 June 2018 - June 2019 - United States Army Major General James D. Craig 
 June 2019 - June 2020 - United States Army Major General Michael D. Turello 
 June 2020 - May 2021 - United States Army Major General Lapthe C. Flora
 May 2021 – May 2022 - United States Army Major General William L. Zana
 May 2022 – Present - United States Army Major General Jami C. Shawley

History

CJTF-HOA was established at Camp Lejeune, North Carolina on October 19, 2002. In November 2002, personnel embarked to the region aboard USS Mount Whitney and arrived at the Horn of Africa on December 8, 2002. CJTF-HOA operated from the Mount Whitney until May 13, 2003, when the mission moved ashore to Camp Lemonnier in Djibouti City, Djibouti. Since then, CJTF-HOA personnel have built schools, clinics and hospitals; conducted dozens of MEDCAPs, DENTCAPs and VETCAPs; drilled and refurbished more than 113 water wells; and trained in collaboration with partner nation militaries.

In January 2004, Brigadier General Mastin Robison of the United States Marine Corps, then commanding the Task Force, had support, medical, and admin staff from the Marines, Navy, Army, and Air Force, a Marine helicopter detachment of four CH-53 Super Stallions, a U.S. Army infantry company, a U.S. Army Reserve civil affairs company, Navy cargo planes, military engineers, and a special operations unit under his command.

Additionally, members of the Task Force assisted with humanitarian assistance missions, including recovery efforts after the collapse of a four-story building in Kenya in 2006, the capsizing of a passenger ferry in Djibouti in 2006, and floods in Ethiopia and Kenya in 2006. Task Force personnel assisted the Government of Uganda in locating and recovering the wreckage of a Russian-built IL-76 transport plane that crashed into Lake Victoria in early 2009.

Transfer to USAFRICOM

On October 1, 2008, responsibility for the task force was transferred from the United States Central Command to the United States Africa Command (USAFRICOM), as the latter assumed authority over the U.S. forces in the region.

Awards

Operations

References

External links

Global Security

Counterterrorism in the United States
Horn of Africa
Joint task forces of the United States Armed Forces
Military units and formations established in 2002